Cassino is a comune in the province of Frosinone, Southern  Italy, at the southern end of the region of Lazio, the last city of the Latin Valley.

Cassino is located at the foot of Monte Cairo near the confluence of the Gari and Liri rivers.  The city is best known as the site of the Abbey of Montecassino and the Battle of Monte Cassino during World War II, which resulted in huge Allied and German casualties as well as the near total destruction of the town itself. It is also home to the University of Cassino.

Cassino has a population of 35,969 , making it the second largest town in the province.

History

Ancient

Cassino's roots lie in the settlement of Casinum, the last city of the Latins, of Umbrian  or Venetic  or Oscan origin, sited atop the hill of Cassino near Monte Cairo, five kilometres to the north.  Casinum passed under the control of the Volscians first and then the Samnites, Eventually Sabini (a Volsci branch and Umbrian/Venetic origins) were defeated by the Romans that gained control of Casinum and its territory (ager casinas), establishing a fortified Latin colony there in 312 BC, Interamna Lirenas.

During the Roman era the most venerated god was Apollo, whose temple rose up on Monte Cassino, where today stands the abbey.
At least once during Punic Wars, Hannibal passed near Casinum. Casinum was also the site of a villa presumed to belong to Marcus Terentius Varro.

Medieval
The ancient Casinum was deeply damaged by several barbarian raids.
In the book Dialogues, Pope Gregory I gives us the testimony of the Benedict of Nursia settlement among the ruins of Casinum Acropolis. He destroyed the image of Apollo and pagan altars, and sanctified the place in name of St. John Baptist. From that moment on, he would never leave Monte Cassino: he founded the monastery that became a model for the Western monasticism and one of the major cultural centers of Europe throughout the Middle Ages and wrote the "Rule", containing precepts for his monks. In the meanwhile the population built a village called Castellum Sancti Petri.

Because of their strategic position, the abbey and the village were involved in military events. In 577 a raid of the Lombards, led by Zotto, forced the monks to leave Monte Cassino to seek refuge in Rome. They came back only after more than a century. In 744, thanks to the donation of Gisulf II of Benevento, the monastery became the capital of a new state, called Terra Sancti Benedicti ("Land of Saint Benedict"). Few years later the town was re-founded by Abbot Bertharius and called Eulogimenopolis, meaning "city of Saint Benedict" in Greek. In 883 the monastery and the town were again attacked, this time by Saracens, and Bertharius was killed along with some other monks.

The abbey was again rebuilt in 949 by the decision of Pope Agapetus II and, together with  the town, renamed San Germano (after Saint Germanus of Capua), began to experience a prosperous period. For defensive purposes, the castle Rocca Janula, which still dominates the town today, was also built. In the abbey are conserved the Placiti Cassinesi, dated 960–963, considered the first documents ever written in the Italian language. The abbey of San Germano had ceased to exist by the time of Abbot Richerius (1038–1055), when it was a parish church under an archpriest.

On July 23, 1230, the city was the site of the signing of the peace between Pope Gregory IX and Frederick II, which took place in the church of San Germano. On 9 September 1349, San Germano was destroyed by a large earthquake, which also seriously damaged the abbey. The reconstruction took place in 1366, at Pope Urbano V's will.

Modern era

During the Renaissance era Cassino lay on the northern frontier of the Kingdom of Naples, which was dominated by Spain. In 1504, during the Second Italian War, the French attempted to capture the town in the Battle of Cassino, but failed.

On May 15–17, 1815, the town was the set of the final cruel battle of the Neapolitan War between an Austrian force commanded by Laval Nugent von Westmeath and the King of Naples, Joachim Murat. The so-called "Battle of San Germano" ended with the Austrian victory.

On July 28, 1863 the name of the town was officially reverted to "Cassino". In the same year the town was reached by the rail system. Cassino was part of the Province Terra di Lavoro (meaning "Land of Work") until 1927, when the Province of Frosinone was founded. On May 21, 1930  a cable car leading from the town to the Abbey in 7 minutes, covering a vertical drop of over 400 metres, was inaugurated.

World War II and afterwards 
In World War II, after southern Italy was invaded by the Allies, the Germans entrenched around the German Gustav Line, which, in its southern tip, was anchored around the mountains behind Cassino. The town was therefore the site of fierce fighting in the Battles of Monte Cassino. On 15 February 1944 the Abbey was destroyed by a heavy aerial bombardment. The Allies, believing that the Abbey was a strategic position occupied by the Germans, bombed it, killing many of the people who had taken refuge. The works of art contained in the Abbey were transferred to Rome by the Germans before the bombing, but many disappeared on the way. On 15 March, the town was completely razed to the ground by aerial bombardment and artillery fire, followed by an unsuccessful Allied attack. 2,026 civilians, one-tenth of the town's entire population of 20,000, were killed by the bombing and fighting before and during the battles of Cassino.

The reconstruction lasted until the 1960s. During the months following the end of the war, the area was afflicted by a malaria epidemic. However, the population received also great solidarity from the rest of Italy in terms of donations and hospitality: many children were hosted by families in northern Italy in the years after the war.
Cassino earned the Gold Medal of Military Valour, and had three war cemeteries built: the "Cassino War Cemetery", housing the Commonwealth victims, the Polish Cemetery and the Germanic Cemetery.

The economy of the area was helped by the industrialization started with the settlement of the Fiat Cassino Plant and its satellite firms, the SKF plant and several paper factories as well as by the establishment of the University of Cassino.

Today the town is commercially developed, even though it has suffered in recent years from the crisis of the automotive sectors.

Geography
Cassino is located at the southern end of the region of Lazio and at the northern end of the historical region called Terra di Lavoro. The city centre is set in a valley at the foot of Monte Cassino and Monte Cairo.

The town is crossed by the rivers Gari and Rapido that join themselves in the area of the Varronian Thermal Baths; forward, in the frazione of Sant'Angelo in Theodice, the Gari joins the Liri, becoming Garigliano, the river that marks the border between the regions Lazio and Campania.

Climate
Because of its valley location, Cassino is often foggy in the winter, with chilly rainfall. Summers are generally quite warm and humid.

Main sights

Abbey of Monte Cassino

Founded by St. Benedict in 529, the Abbey of Monte Cassino is one of the most famous monasteries in the world and is the source of the Benedictine Order. It has been destroyed four times in its millennial history, the last time in 1944 by Allied bombing. It has been rebuilt "Com'era, dov'era" ("How it was, where it was") after the war, and reconsecrated by Pope Paul VI in 1964.

Archaeological sites

 Casinum Roman city
 Roman theatre: still used in the summer for events, shows and concerts.
 Roman amphitheatre
 Part of the historical Via Latina
 Mausoleum of Ummidia Quadratilla
Rocca Janula: a castle overlooking the city, which was one of Abbey's historical strongholds. Recently restored, it is not visitable.

War Cemeteries

 Cassino War Cemetery
 German War Cemetery
 Polish Cemetery

Natural areas

 Villa Comunale: it is the main public park in the town.
 Baden Powell Park: second public park, that host the main non profit associations and clubs in the town.
 Varronian Thermal Baths: thermal area located where there used to be Marcus Terentius Varro's villa.

Museums
 Historiale: Second World War multimedial museum, created by Carlo Rambaldi.
 National Archaeological Museum  "G.Carrettoni"
 CAMUSAC: museum of contemporary art.

Economy
Cassino's economy is based on industry and tertiary. The Fiat Chrysler Plant and its satellite firms employs a significant part of the population. As a consequence, the economy is strongly influenced by the automotive sector's trends, as experienced from the recent crisis. In Cassino there is also an SKF plant and several paper mills and marble factories.

The weekly market that occur every Sunday, is also an attraction of people from the surrounding municipalities. Cassino is also home to a Courthouse.

Education
Cassino hosts the University of Cassino with the faculties of Economics, Law, Languages and Physical Education located in the Campus and the faculties of Engineering and Literature located in the city centre.
Cassino also hosts branches of the Sapienza University of Rome and the University of Rome Tor Vergata for the degrees in Physiotherapy and Nursing. University of Cassino and Southern Lazio with a score of 66.8 points is ranked #1711 among the world's best universities by cwur.org.

Transport
Being in a crossroads among the regions Lazio, Campania, Abruzzo and Molise, Cassino has always been a strategic hub for transports and communications.

Roads
 Autostrada A1: motorway (tollway) that links Milan and Naples.
 SS509: highway that links Cassino with Formia (to the coast) and Sora.

Rail

The town of Cassino is along the Rome–Cassino–Naples railway line. It is also linked with Abruzzo and Apulia.
Cassino is served by two stations:
 Cassino station: opened in 1863, is the main railway station. It is located in the city centre.
 Fontanarosa-Cervaro station: is a railway station located in the South part of the town, which mainly serves the locality called Fontana Rosa and the municipality of Cervaro.

Bus
The companies Magni and Mastrantoni provides services into the city centre. Cotral links the town with other municipalities in Lazio, CLP with Campania and ATM with Molise.

Sports
Cassino's main football team is A.S.D. Cassino Calcio 1924 that currently plays in Serie D, the fourth division. In its best seasons the team used to play in Serie C2 and Lega Pro Seconda Divisione. The club plays in the stadium "Gino Salveti".

The main basketball team is Virtus Terra di San Benedetto Cassino. It plays in Divisione Nazionale B. In the past the Basket Cassino reached the Serie B league. The team has been also guided by coach Sergei Belov.

Twin cities

Cassino is twinned with:
 Steglitz-Zehlendorf (borough of Berlin), Germany, since 1969
 Zamość, Poland, since 1969
 Falaise, France, since 1974
 Tychy, Poland, since 1977
 Užice, Serbia since 1981
 North York, Canada, since 1987
 Karlovy Vary, Czech Republic, since 1991
 Ortona, Italy, since 1991
 Casino, Australia, since 1997
 Cavarzere, Italy, since 1998
 Senglea, Malta, since 2003
 Leno, Italy, since 2005
 Olinda, Brazil, since 2006

People
 Arturo Gatti, Canadian professional boxer, was born in Cassino.
 Marcus Terentius Varro, ancient Roman scholar and writer, had a villa in Cassino.
 Benedict of Nursia, Christian saint, patron of Cassino and Europe, founded the abbey of Montecassino.
 Scholastica, Christian saint, founded the female Benedictine Order in Cassino.
 Bertharius, Christian martyr and saint, abbot of Montecassino.
 Richard of San Germano, notary and historian, was born in Cassino.
 Pope Gregory IX, pope, signed the peace with Frederick II in Cassino.
 Leopold VI, Duke of Austria, died in Cassino.
 Piero de' Medici, politician, governor of Cassino.
 Philip Neri, priest, had his religious conversion in Cassino.
 Giuseppe Moscati,  doctor, scientific researcher, and university professor, lived in Cassino.
 Antonio Labriola, philosopher, was born in Cassino.
 Michael Valente, World War I Medal of Honor recipient.
 Severino Gazzelloni, flute player, died in Cassino.
 Dante Troisi, magistrate in Cassino.
 Vittorio Miele, painter.
 Francesco Storace, politician, was born in Cassino.
 Gino Matrundola, former Canadian politician.
 Sergei Belov, former professional basketball player, coach of Basket Cassino in 1991-1993.
 Pietro Mennea, established the world record in the distance 150 m. in Cassino;
 Domenico Di Carlo, former professional football player and manager, was born in Cassino.
 Dino Lenny, DJ, singer, record producer and record label owner, lived in Cassino. 
 Trevor Trevisan, professional football player, was born in Cassino.
 Angelo Ogbonna, professional football player, was born in Cassino.

See also
Abbey of Monte Cassino
Battle of Cassino
Cassino Memorial

References

External links

Historiale Museum of Cassino 
News Cassino 

 
Cities and towns in Lazio